Coup de tête is a 1979 French comedy-drama film directed by Jean-Jacques Annaud and scripted by Francis Veber. It stars Patrick Dewaere and Jean Bouise, who won the César Award for Best Actor in a Supporting Role for his performance.

Plot 
François Perrin is a belligerent factory worker who plays football for a local amateur team, in a club owned by a rich businessman who also owns the factory where Perrin, as well as most of the population of Trincamp, works. His attitude doesn't endear him to anyone, and the situation is not helped when, at a training session, he pushes Berthier, the star and captain of the team, who demands that Perrin be expelled. Soon thereafter, he is also fired from his job, and the whole town turns against him and he is even prohibited from entering the local bar. When a drunk Berthier tries to rape a woman one night, Perrin is immediately framed for the deed, and ends up in jail after being brutalized by the police. Two months later, the Trincamp team is to participate in an important game for the France's Cup, but the bus carrying the team gets into an accident, and out of desperation to replace the injured players, Perrin is released from jail to help out the team. While on the way to the stadium, he manages to evade police and finds the rape victim and confront her. Rather than resulting in conflict, he actually finds someone who believes him, since she was not positive in her earlier identification, and she decides to investigate the testimonies that convicted Perrin, while he goes on to play and scores both of his team's goals in a very tight victory. Perrin is now the town's hero, and he uses that position and the knowledge of who did what and who made false reports to the police to plot a subtle but effective revenge on those who have wronged him.

Cast 
Patrick Dewaere - François Perrin
France Dougnac - Stéphanie Lefebvre
Dorothée Jemma - Marie
Maurice Barrier - Berri, the 'Penalty' bar patron
Robert Dalban - Jean-Jean, the manager general
Mario David - Rumin, the physical therapist
Hubert Deschamps - the prison warden
Dora Doll - the chief nun
François Dyrek - the first truck driver
Patrick Floersheim - Berthier, Trincamp star player
Michel Fortin - Langlumey, the coach
Jacques Frantz - the second truck driver
Gérard Hernandez - the police lieutenant
Claude Legros - Poilane, the waiter
Corinne Marchand - Madame Sivardière
Jean Bouise - the CEO Mr Sivardière
Michel Aumont - Brochard, Fiat cars dealer
Catherine Samie - Mme Brochard
Paul Le Person - Lozerand, the furniture dealer
Jean-Pierre Darroussin - the photographer (uncredited)

References

External links 

 

1979 films
Films directed by Jean-Jacques Annaud
Films featuring a Best Supporting Actor César Award-winning performance
French association football films
French films about revenge
1970s French-language films
1970s French films
Films with screenplays by Francis Veber